Ram Prasad Sarmah is an Indian National Congress Assam Pradesh politician from Assam.Earlier in 2014, he was contested from Bharatiya Janata Party from Tezpur Loksabha Constituency. He is the current President of Assam Gorkha Sammelan. He is an advocate at the Gauhati High Court, and has been fielded as the candidate from the Tezpur constituency by his party in the 2014 Indian general election which he won. He did his Bachelor of Laws From Tura Law College in 1980-81 and Bachelor of Arts From Mendipathar College in 1976.

References

 

India MPs 2014–2019
Living people
Lok Sabha members from Assam
People from Sonitpur district
Bharatiya Janata Party politicians from Assam
1955 births